Wilhelmine Schirmer-Pröscher (7 July 1889,  Giessen – 2 March 1992, Berlin) was an East German politician of the Liberal Democratic Party of Germany who gained some measure of importance in her nation.

References 

1889 births
1992 deaths
People from Giessen
People from the Grand Duchy of Hesse
German Democratic Party politicians
Liberal Democratic Party of Germany politicians
Free Democratic Party (Germany) politicians
Members of the Provisional Volkskammer
Members of the 1st Volkskammer
Members of the 2nd Volkskammer
Members of the 3rd Volkskammer
Members of the 4th Volkskammer
Members of the 5th Volkskammer
Members of the 6th Volkskammer
Members of the 7th Volkskammer
Members of the 8th Volkskammer
Members of the 9th Volkskammer
Democratic Women's League of Germany members
Female members of the Volkskammer
Recipients of the Patriotic Order of Merit (honor clasp)
Recipients of the Banner of Labor